The 2020 American Athletic Conference men's soccer season was the 8th season of men's varsity soccer in the conference. The season began in February 2021 and concluded in April 2021.

The season was originally scheduled to run from August 28, 2020, to November 6, 2020, but was postponed due to the COVID-19 pandemic.

UCF are the defending regular season champions and SMU are the defending tournament champions.

Background

Previous season 

The 2018 regular season was won by UCF, who finished conference play with a 5–1–1 record, and won on tiebreakers against SMU. SMU won the 2018 American Tournament, defeating UCF 5–4 in penalty kicks following a 1–1 draw in regulation and overtime. SMU earned the conference's automatic berth into the NCAA Tournament, while UCF and Connecticut received at-large berths into the tournament. In the NCAA Tournament, SMU lost in the first round to Oregon State. Connecticut beat rivals, Rhode Island, in the first round, before losing to Indiana in the second round. UCF was one of the 16 seeded teams (seeded 14th), allowing them to earn a bye into the second round. There, they lost in overtime to Lipscomb.

Following the season, Cal Jennings won the Offensive MVP award for the conference. Jacob Hauser-Ramsey of Connecticut won the Defensive MVP. Fellow UCF players, Louis Perez, Yannik Oettl, and Scott Calabrese won the AAC Midfielder, Goalkeeper, and Coach of the Year awards, respectively. Perez and Jennings were also named All-Americans by United Soccer Coaches.

Emil Cuello was the first AAC player to be drafted in the 2019 MLS SuperDraft, when he was selected by the LA Galaxy with the 19th overall pick in the first round of the draft.

Program changes 
Two AAC programs, UConn and Cincinnati, departed prior to the 2020 season. UConn left for the Big East Conference, and Cincinnati disbanded their men's soccer program due to the ongoing COVID-19 pandemic.

Head coaches

Preseason

Preseason poll 

The preseason poll was released on January 25, 2021. SMU was picked to the win the conference.

Preseason national rankings 
The preseason national rankings are normally announced in August. United Soccer Coaches, Soccer America, and TopDrawerSoccer.com delayed their Top-25 preseason poll to the start of the spring season. CollegeSoccerNews.com did a Top-30 preseason poll in September 2020. TopDrawer Soccer, Soccer America, and United Soccer Coaches released their rankings in February 2021.

Preseason All-Conference teams 

Preseason All-AAC Team

MLS SuperDraft

Total picks by school

List of selections

Homegrown contracts 
The Homegrown Player Rule is a Major League Soccer program that allows MLS teams to sign local players from their own development academies directly to MLS first team rosters. Before the creation of the rule in 2008, every player entering Major League Soccer had to be assigned through one of the existing MLS player allocation processes, such as the MLS SuperDraft.

To place a player on its homegrown player list, making him eligible to sign as a homegrown player, players must have resided in that club's home territory and participated in the club's youth development system for at least one year. Players can play college soccer and still be eligible to sign a homegrown contract.

References

External links 
 American Athletic Conference Men's Soccer

 
2020 NCAA Division I men's soccer season
Association football events postponed due to the COVID-19 pandemic